Ellington '66 is an album by American pianist, composer, and bandleader Duke Ellington that was recorded and released on the Reprise label in 1965. The album won a Grammy Award for  Best Instrumental Jazz Performance – Large Group or Soloist with Large Group.

Reception 
The Allmusic review by Matt Collar awarded the album 3½ stars and stated "Ellington '66 is yet another example of how the change in popular music toward an all rock & roll format found jazz musicians attempting crossover material with varying degrees of success... While Ellington '66 isn't a bad recording and actually bests '65 for sheer listening pleasure, it is by no means required listening and will most likely appeal to die-hard Ellington completists".

Track listing 
 "Red Roses for a Blue Lady" (Sid Tepper, Roy C. Bennett) – 3:40
 "Charade" (Henry Mancini, Johnny Mercer) – 2:40
 "People" (Jule Styne, Bob Merrill) – 3:22
 "All My Loving" (John Lennon, Paul McCartney) – 3:26
 "A Beautiful Friendship" (Donald Kahn, Stanley Styne) – 2:47
 "I Want to Hold Your Hand" (Lennon, McCartney) – 2:04
 "Days of Wine and Roses" (Mancini, Mercer) – 3:23
 "I Can't Stop Loving You" (Don Gibson) – 3:57
 "The Good Life" (Sacha Distel, Jack Reardon) – 3:16
 "Satin Doll" (Ellington, Mercer, Billy Strayhorn) – 2:31
 "Moon River" (Mancini, Mercer) – 2:42
 "Ellington '66" (Ellington) – 2:34

Personnel 
 Duke Ellington – piano
 Cat Anderson, Herb Jones, Cootie Williams – trumpet
 Rolf Ericson – trumpet (tracks 2, 3, 8 & 9)
 Ray Nance – trumpet (tracks 1, 4–7 & 10–12)
 Mercer Ellington – trumpet (tracks 4, 7, 10 & 11)
 Lawrence Brown, Buster Cooper – trombone
 Chuck Connors – bass trombone
 Jimmy Hamilton – clarinet, tenor saxophone
 Johnny Hodges – alto saxophone
 Russell Procope – alto saxophone, clarinet
 Paul Gonsalves, Harry Carney – tenor saxophone
 Peck Morrison – double bass (tracks 2, 3, 8 & 9)
 John Lamb – bass (tracks 1, 4–7 & 10–12)
 Sam Woodyard – drums

References 

Reprise Records albums
Duke Ellington albums
1965 albums
Grammy Award for Best Large Jazz Ensemble Album